ANZCO Foods or simply ANZCO (formally ANZCO Foods Ltd and previously the Asian New Zealand Meat Company Limited) is a New Zealand meat producer fully owned by the Japanese company Itoham Foods, which in turn is part of Itoham Yonekyu Holdings. In 2016, ANZCO Foods was New Zealand's fifth-largest exporter, with a turnover of NZ$1.5b, and 3,000 employees.

History
ANZCO started as a company in 1984 under the legal name Asian New Zealand Meat Company Limited owned through the New Zealand Meat Producers Board by individual farmers and led by Graeme Harrison. In 1989, Itoham Foods and ANZCO formed a 50–50 partnership and founded Five Star Beef, a company that operates a feedlot in Wakanui near Ashburton; this is New Zealand's largest feedlot and mainly exports to Japan. In 1995, the ANZCO management team led a buy-out of the company from the Meat Producers Board, with Itoham Foods taking a 48.3% minority shareholding and another Japanese company, Nissui (Nippon Suisan Kaisha Ltd), taking a smaller shareholding. Through that buy-out, the initial investment of NZ$350,000 returned over NZ$40m to the original owners. ANZCO Foods started operating under the new ownership arrangement on 17 August 1995.

In 2015, founder Harrison announced that he intended to retire in the near future. This was accompanied by a restructure in shareholding. With approval from the Overseas Investment Office (OIO), Itoham Foods increased its shareholding from 48.3% to 65% and paid just over NZ$40m for these transactions. The seven smallest shareholders were all offered to sell. Harrison himself sold down from just over 20% to 14%. Nissui sold part of its stake at this point (which made up just over 50% of the share transfer) with the balance coming from New Zealand shareholders.

In late 2017, Itoham Foods received OIO approval to become to sole owner by obtaining the remaining 35% shareholding. Nissui held 16.8% at that point, and Harrison and other managers held 18.2%. Itoham Foods is a subsidiary to Itoham Yonekyu Holdings. Itoham is publicly listed and 39% owned by the Mitsubishi Corporation. Harrison retired from the company after the March 2018 annual general meeting; he had been at the helm of the company for 34 years, first as managing director and then as chairperson.

Governance

Chairperson:
Eddie Tonks (?–2004)
Graeme Harrison (2004–2018)
Kazuhiko (Sam) Misonou (2018–present)

Chief executives:
Graeme Harrison (1984–2004)
Mark Clarkson
Peter Conley (2017–present)

Land holdings

ANZCO Foods holds land in ten locations in New Zealand.

References

Articles containing video clips
Companies based in Christchurch
Agriculture companies of New Zealand
Privately held companies of New Zealand
New Zealand companies established in 1984
Agriculture companies established in 1984
2017 mergers and acquisitions